Ed Eagan (born June 19, 1993) is a former American football wide receiver. He played college football at Northwestern State.

College career
As a freshman at Northwestern State, Eagan played sporadically at cornerback and return duty. He scored his first touchdown on an 82-yard kick return against Sam Houston State.

Eagan switched to receiver his sophomore year, but maintained his return duties. He became the second-leading receiver for Northwestern State and its top returner. In 2014, his junior year, Eagan broke various records at Northwestern, including career kickoff return yardage (2,125), single-season kickoff return yardage (1,045), single-season kickoff returns (45), single-season receptions (73) by 19 catches, single-game receiving yardage (238 vs. McNeese), and tied the single-game receptions mark (13 vs. Abilene Christian). He also won various awards, including All-American by College Sporting News, All-Southland Conference at receiver, returner, and all-purpose, and Associated Press 2014 FCS All-American Team, All-Purpose Player.

Eagan finished his college career with 177 receptions and 2,228 receiving yards, both Northwestern records. He had 13 receiving touchdowns, as well as over 2,900 kick return yards and 4 return touchdowns.

Professional career

Dallas Cowboys
Eagan signed with the Dallas Cowboys as an undrafted free agent on May 6, 2016. He was released by the Cowboys on August 10, 2016.

Cleveland Browns
On August 14, 2016, Eagan was signed by the Cleveland Browns. He was released by the Browns on August 29, 2016.

Buffalo Bills
On September 27, 2016, Eagan was signed to the Buffalo Bills' practice squad. He was promoted to the active roster on October 25, 2016, but was released three days later. He was re-signed to the practice squad on October 31, 2016.

New York Giants
On August 18, 2017, Eagan signed with the New York Giants. He was waived on September 2, 2017, and re-signed to the practice squad on September 20, 2017. He was promoted to the active roster on October 10, 2017. He was waived on November 14, 2017.

DC Defenders
Eagan signed with the DC Defenders of the XFL on January 8, 2020. He was waived during final roster cuts on January 22, 2020.

References

External links
NFL stats and info

Living people
1993 births
Players of American football from New Orleans
American football wide receivers
Northwestern State Demons football players
Dallas Cowboys players
Cleveland Browns players
Buffalo Bills players
New York Giants players
DC Defenders players